Lights from the East: I Am Maluku is a 2014 Indonesian sports drama film written, directed, and produced by Angga Dwimas Sasongko. The film stars Chicco Jerikho, Shafira Uum, Abdurrahman Arif, and Jajang C. Noer.

The film was well received and won several awards, including the Citra Award for Best Picture and the Maya Award for Best Feature Film. Jerikho's performance as a former soccer player helping kids avoid sectarian conflicts through soccer won praise and garnered him the Citra Award for Best Actor, the Maya Award for Best Actor in a Leading Role, and the Indonesian Movie Awards for both Best Actor and Favorite Actor.

Synopsis 
After witnessing a child's death during a violent clash, a former soccer player launches a youth team to help local kids avoid further bloodshed.

Cast
 Chicco Jerikho as Sani Tawainella, a former soccer player
 Shafira Uum as Haspa Umarella
 Abdurrahman Arif as Yosef Matulessy
 Burhanuddin Ohorella as Alfin Tuasalamony
 Bebeto Leutually as Salim Ohorella
 Jajang C. Noer as Alfin's mother
 Glenn Fredly as Sufyan Lestaluhu

Awards and nominations

References

External links
 

Indonesian drama films
2014 films
Association football films
2010s Indonesian-language films
Citra Award winners
Maya Award winners
2010s sports drama films